Kresin may refer to:
 Křesín, a village and municipality in the Ústí nad Labem Region of the Czech Republic
 Křešín (Příbram District), a village and municipality in the Central Bohemian Region of the Czech Republic
 Křešín (Pelhřimov District), a village and municipality in the Vysočina Region of the Czech Republic